Tamworth Football Club is an English association football club based in Tamworth, Staffordshire.

The club was formed in 1933 after the previous Tamworth club, Tamworth Castle, ceased to exist.  After playing in the Birmingham Combination and West Midlands (Regional) League, the team reached the Southern League in 1972, but subsequently fell on hard times and returned to lower-level football.  In 1989 Tamworth returned to the Southern League and a year later won the FA Vase.  Tamworth reached the final of the FA Trophy in 2003 and in the same season won promotion to the Football Conference, going on to spend four seasons at the highest level of non-League football before being relegated to the Conference North.  In 2009 the club gained promotion back to the Conference Premier, and spent five seasons at that level before being relegated.  Further relegation in 2018 took the club back to the Southern League.

The team originally played at The Jolly Sailor Ground but after a year moved into The Lamb Ground, named after a pub which formerly stood nearby.  The stadium currently has a capacity of just under 5,000 and a 3G artificial pitch which was laid in 2016.  Local rivals include Burton Albion and Nuneaton Town, and to a lesser degree Atherstone Town, Bedworth United and Bolehall Swifts.

History

Early years
The town of Tamworth had been represented at football by Tamworth Castle F.C. until the club folded in 1933. This void was filled thanks to a campaign started by a letter from a local businessman in the local newspaper setting in motion the formation of Tamworth F.C. Originally playing next to the Jolly Sailor pub, the club moved to their present ground, the Lamb Ground, in 1934. Tamworth began life competing in the Birmingham Combination, before joining the Birmingham and District League, subsequently renamed the West Midlands (Regional) League, in 1954.  In the 1960s Tamworth experienced success, winning the league in 1963–64 and 1965–66 and finishing as runners-up on two other occasions, as well as lifting the West Midlands League Cup, Birmingham Senior Cup and Staffordshire Senior Cup in that decade.

In 1972 Tamworth gained promotion to the Southern League following a third West Midlands League title, but a period of falling attendances and financial difficulties followed. The club returned to the West Midlands League in 1984, and was taken over by a consortium of local businessmen.  In 1987–88 Tamworth won the League and were promoted back to the Southern League.

FA Vase win and promotion to the Conference
In 1989 Tamworth, managed by Graham Smith, reached the final of the FA Vase for the first time, one year after gaining promotion back to the Southern League.  The final against Sudbury Town was played at Wembley Stadium and finished in a 1–1 draw with Martin Devaney scoring for Tamworth, meaning that the winner would have to be decided by a replay. The replay was played at London Road, the home of Peterborough United, and Tamworth won 3–0 with two goals from Mark Stanton and one from Ian Moores to lift the FA Vase for the first time.  In 1997 The Lambs won the championship of the Southern League Midland Division and gained promotion to the Premier Division.

In the 2001–02 season, Tamworth narrowly missed out on promotion to the Football Conference, the highest level of non-League football.  The Lambs   earned a 3–3 draw on the final day away to Folkestone Invicta but Kettering Town won their final game, allow them to overtake Tamworth for first place and win promotion to the Conference.  The following season, however, Tamworth won the championship of the Southern League to gain promotion, finishing 13 points ahead of second-placed Stafford Rangers.  In the same season Tamworth also reached the final of the FA Trophy where they played Burscough but were denied a double, losing 2–1 at Villa Park.

The club completed perhaps their highest profile signing of all time on 23 February 2006, with the capture of former England international midfielder Paul Merson. However, the arrangement meant that until the end of the season, the majority of Merson's wages were to be paid by the club he used to manage, Walsall. The arrangement however only lasted two games, although Merson only played once in the 2–1 home loss to Halifax Town. Merson was dropped to the bench for the following game, which was a 5–0 defeat away to Grays Athletic.  Merson later announced his retirement from professional football as a player on 9 March 2006, less than a month after joining Tamworth.  Although the club finished the 2005–06 season in 21st position (the last relegation position) in the Conference Premier, the club were spared the drop after Canvey Island resigned from the league. The Lambs did, however, reach the 3rd round of the FA Cup for the first time that season.

Relegation and return to the Conference Premier
Despite a fairly poor 2006–07 league campaign, Tamworth once again found themselves at the 3rd round stage of the FA Cup. Norwich City beat The Lambs, and 18 days later Tamworth manager Mark Cooper and assistant manager Richard Dryden were dismissed with the club at the foot of the league table. They were replaced two days later by the former Tamworth managerial duo of manager Gary Mills and assistant Darron Gee. Despite the change in leadership, Tamworth were relegated to the Conference North after finishing in 22nd position.

The club won promotion back to the Conference Premier at the second attempt, with a 1–0 win over Hinckley United on 21 April 2009 thanks to a goal from Nick Wright securing the title and promotion back to the Conference Premier.

On 13 October 2010, manager Gary Mills quit Tamworth to join fellow Conference Premier side York City, names of possible replacements started to circulate and many believed that Ian McParland had expressed interest in the job.  However first team coach Des Lyttle became caretaker manager and was later hired as player-manager. He resigned as manager on 13 April 2011, and was replaced by Tamworth legend Dale Belford, who was to manage the club for the remaining four games of the season. Belford led Tamworth to last day safety with a 2–1 home win over Forest Green Rovers, with Jake Sheridan scoring the all important winning goal.  Belford stepped aside at the end of the season, and the search for a new manager to lead the club for the 2011–12 Conference Premier season began, speculation was rife, and the names of former York City manager Martin Foyle, Eastwood Town manager Paul Cox and former Walsall assistant manager Martin O'Connor were all linked to the club, but on 25 May 2011, Tamworth announced Kettering Town manager Marcus Law as the club's new manager.

Tamworth were defeated by Everton in the 3rd round of the 2011–12 FA Cup 2–0 on 6 January 2012. Around 5,000 Lambs supporters made the trip to Goodison Park.

Law was relieved of his managerial duties on 14 January 2013, and Dale Belford was appointed as caretaker manager for the foreseeable future with former Lambs player Scott Lindsey as his assistant.

Conference North and Southern League
The 2013–14 season was ultimately one to forget for the Lambs.  In a season that included a few highlights such as progress to the 2nd round of the 2013-14 FA Cup, where they were beaten 2–1 at home to Bristol City, Tamworth could not survive in the league and finished 23rd, dropping down into the Conference North after five seasons in the English fifth tier.  On 15 September 2014, with Tamworth in the bottom three of the Conference North, Belford left the club by mutual consent and was replaced by former Wrexham manager Andy Morrell. Despite a 12-game winning run, promotion was just out of reach as Tamworth failed to get into the play-offs on goal difference.

Tamworth began the 2018–19 season in the newly formed Southern League Premier Central, and announced a new first team management consisting of Mike Fowler, as head coach, Tim Harris as director of football and the return of Paul Green as player-coach.

On 10 September 2018, following a disappointing start to the season, head coach Mike Fowler stepped down from his role. Tim Harris also left the club on 20 September 2018, to take the director of football role at Hereford. On the same day Dennis Greene was confirmed as the club's new manager, but he remained in the post for only four months before being dismissed following a string of disappointing results.  On 8 March 2019, Andrew Danylyszyn and club legend Gary Smith were announced as joint managers for the club until the end of the season, with the management duo securing the job following a five-game unbeaten run while in a caretaker role at the club.  Danylyszyn and Smith were jointly named manager of the month for March 2019 following four wins and a draw in their first five games in charge.  Following much improved performances on the pitch, the duo steered the club away from relegation and secured a 12th position in their first season in the Southern League Premier Central.  It was officially confirmed on 22 April 2019 that Danylyszyn and Smith had been appointed the club's permanent management duo, and would lead the club into the 2019–20 season.  They were joined at the club by former Kettering Town and Stratford Town manager Thomas Baillie, who was appointed as Head of Senior Football.

Colours and badge

As of 2009, Tamworth play in an all red kit with white sides, and with the 2010–11 season there was no change colours but the white stripes on the sides moved so they went down as far as the sleeves. In 2011-12 the white sides changed to black and the shorts also changed to dark blue.
In 2012-13 the colours changed to go back to all red kits with white stripes on the side.

The Tamworth FC badge features the  flag and the Stafford knot, the symbol of Staffordshire next to the Tamworth castle.

Stadium

Tamworth have played at The Lamb Ground since 1934. Prior to this, they spent their first season at a ground adjacent to the Jolly Sailor pub. The Lamb Ground takes its name from a pub, the Lamb Inn, which formerly stood nearby. The ground has a capacity of approximately 4,000, and a directors box. All seating is in the Main Stand, which was constructed in 1997. The Main Stand occupies one side of the pitch, with a covered terrace known as the Shed on the opposite side.  As soon as the 2015–16 season finished, work began on a new 3G pitch, the first of its kind in the Conference North. This was ready in time for the 2016–17 season and is available for the community as a whole to use.

Players

Current squad
 

The Southern Football League does not use a squad numbering system.

Out on loan

Former players
See Tamworth F.C. players

Management and coaching staff

Current staff

Managerial history

Supporters' Player of the Year

Player name in bold represents players still on the playing staff of the club.

Honours

Conference North
Champions: 2009
Southern Football League Premier Division
Champions: 2003
Runners-up: 2002
FA Trophy
Runners-up: 2003
FA Vase
Champions: 1989
Southern Football League Division One Midlands
Champions: 1997
West Midlands (Regional) League
Champions: 1964, 1966, 1972, 1988
West Midlands League Cup
Champions: 1965, 1966, 1972, 1986, 1988
Birmingham Senior Cup
Champions: 1961, 1966, 1969
Staffordshire Senior Cup
Champions: 1959, 1964, 1966, 2002
Harry Godfrey Trophy
Champions: 1994, 1997
Bass Charity Vase
Champions: 1937

Records
 Best League Position: 15th in Conference National (Level 5), 2004/05
 Best FA Cup performance: 3rd round, 2005/06, 2006/07 and 2011/12
 Record Transfer Paid: £7,500 to Ilkeston Town for Tony Hemmings, 2000
 Record Transfer Received: £12,000 from Kidderminster Harriers for Scott Rickards, 2003
 Record Attendance: 4,920 v Atherstone Town, 1948
 Record Victory: 14–4 v Holbrook Institute, 1933
 Record Defeat: 11–0 v Solihull Borough, 1940

Shirt/shorts sponsors/manufacturers

Following seven years with Nike, Inc., the club confirmed the kit manufacturer to be Umbro for the 2007/08 season.

Snowdome were confirmed as the club's new shirt sponsor on 24 June 2009, agreeing to a three-year shirt sponsorship deal with the club. Automotive Solutions agreed a one-year short sponsorship, while Admiral Sportswear would be manufacturing the club's players and replica kits.

On 14 July 2011, it was confirmed that Tamworth based IT Consultancy company, Computer Friendly Consultants would be renewing their back of shirt sponsor for the 2011/12 season. Solus Coaches were announced as the first team shorts sponsor for the 2011/12 season.

Tamworth announced on 27 March 2012 that their away kit for the 2012/13 season would be sponsored by Drayton Manor, with the club's kits now been supplied by Jako. The club followed this up on 26 April 2012 with confirmation that Solus Coaches would sponsor the team home shirt for the 2012/13 season. The club confirmed on 2 May 2013 the kits would again be supplied by and sponsored by the same companies as the previous season.

Tamworth confirmed on 30 June 2014 that their kits would again be made by Jako, and would be sponsored by two local companies, on the front of the shirts would be Bradley Scott Windows and on the back J. Clarke Transport.

Tamworth announced for 2016/17 season that the club's shirts would again be supplied by Jako, for the fifth season running, and the home shirt would again be sponsored by Solus Coaches and the away shirt would be sponsored by local restaurant Turpins.

For the 2017/18 season, Tamworth confirmed on 24 April 2017, their home shirts would be supplied by Macron Cardiff, and the shirt sponsor would be Bradley Scott Windows. On 23 April 2018 it was announced the club's kit would again be supplied by Macron Cardiff, and the shirt would be sponsored by J. Clarke Transport.

Tamworth confirmed on 24 April 2019 that their new kit for the 2019/20 season would be available from the club shop at the final match of the season, again kit supplied by Macron Cardiff, and Solus Coaches would return as the shirt sponsor.

It was confirmed on 17 August 2020, that Tamworth's shirt for the 2020/21 season would be kit supplied by Macron Cardiff for a fourth season, and would once again be sponsored by Bradley Scott Windows.

Tamworth finished the 2021–22 season on 23 April 2022, and alongside the club's end of season awards, it was announced that the club had signed a deal with Italian sports brand Kappa, with details of the shirt to be announced in due course.

References

External links

Heritage site
Fan's Forum

 
Association football clubs established in 1933
National League (English football) clubs
Football clubs in Staffordshire
Southern Football League clubs
1933 establishments in England
Football clubs in England
Sport in Tamworth, Staffordshire